Burgess "Bert" Wakefield (May 1870 - death date unknown) was a Negro leagues first baseman and for several years before the founding of the first Negro National League.

He played for Frank Leland's traveling Chicago Unions for at least two years. There he played with Home Run Johnson, Bill Holland, and Harry Hyde.

References

External links
Negro league baseball statistics and player information from Baseball-Reference and Seamheads

Chicago Unions players
1870 births
Baseball players from Kansas
Baseball first basemen
Year of death missing